Almost a Full Moon is a Christmas album by Canadian artist Hawksley Workman released in 2001. The album was written, produced, and performed by Hawksley Workman. It was recorded & mixed at Recall Rooms in Paris, France by Stephane Lumbroso (except "Common Cold" which was recorded & mixed by James Paul at the Rogue, Toronto, Ontario).

The album was re-released in 2002 with new cover art and a new track list by Isadora Records/Universal Music

In 2022, a holiday musical based on the album written by playwright Charlotte Corbeil-Coleman with Workman premiered at the Citadel Theatre in Edmonton.

Track listing

References

Hawksley Workman albums
2001 Christmas albums
Christmas albums by Canadian artists